The County of Montechiarugolo was a small sovereign state of northern Italy which existed from 1456 to 1612. It included the other fief of Casei.

It was created from a splitting in the county of Guastalla between count Cristoforo Torelli and Pietro Guido I Torelli, first count of Montechiarugolo. The title was held by the Torelli family in his whole history, until in 1612 it was annexed by Ranuccio I Farnese, Duke of Parma.

Counties of the Holy Roman Empire
Italian states
1456 establishments in Europe
15th-century establishments in Italy
History of Emilia-Romagna
Montechiarugolo
Former monarchies of Europe